Checkmate is a situation in the game of chess and other activities which results in defeat.

Checkmate or Checkmates may also refer to:

Fiction and drama
 Checkmate (comics), the title of two series published by DC Comics
 Checkmate (play), an 1869 farcical play by Andrew Halliday
 Checkmate, an 1871 novel by Sheridan Le Fanu
 Checkmates, a 1987 play by Ron Milner
 Checkmates, a 1989 play with Vanessa L. Williams
 Checkmate (Sydney Horler novel), a 1930 novel by Sydney Horler
 Checkmate, a short story from A Twist in the Tale
 Checkmate, the fourth novel in the Noughts & Crosses series by Malorie Blackman
 Checkmate, the sixth book in the Lymond Chronicles by Dorothy Dunnett

Film

 Checkmate (1911 film), an American silent short drama film
 Checkmate (1931 film), a German film
 Checkmate (1935 film), a British film 
 Checkmate (2008 film), an Indian film 
 Checkmate (2010 film), a Ghanaian film
 Checkmate (short film), a short drama film

Music
 Checkmate (Joe Pass and Jimmy Rowles album), 1981
 Checkmate (B.G. album), 2000
 Checkmate! (album), 2011
 Check Mate (Barrabás album), 1975
 Checkmate (EP), 2022 EP by Itzy
 "Checkmate" (Jung Yong-hwa and JJ Lin song), 2015
 "Checkmate" (Jadakiss song), 2005
 "Checkmate", a song from Kid Krow by Conan Gray
 "Checkmate", a song from the Cypress Hill album Cypress Hill IV
 "Checkmate", a song from the Gryphon album Red Queen to Gryphon Three
 Checkmate (rapper), Canadian hip hop artist
 Checkmates, Ltd., American R&B group

Television
 Checkmate (American TV series), the title of a 1960–1962 American mystery television series
 Checkmate (Indian TV series), a Bengali television series
 Checkmate (Nigerian TV series), a Nigerian soap opera
 "Checkmate" (Arrow), an episode of Arrow
 "Checkmate", fourth episode of the 1965 Doctor Who serial The Time Meddler
 "Checkmate" (The Prisoner), a 1967 episode of The Prisoner
 "Checkmate" (Twin Peaks), a season two episode of the cult series, Twin Peaks

Other
 Checkmate (ballet), the music for ballet by British composer Arthur Bliss
 Checkmate pattern
 Check-mate system, a ship identification protocol used by the Royal Navy in World War II
 Sukhoi Checkmate, a fifth generation Light Tactical Aircraft by Sukhoi

See also 
 Check (disambiguation)
 Operation Checkmate (disambiguation)
 Jaque Mate (disambiguation)